Ali Sardar Jafri (29 November 1913 – 1 August 2000) was an Indian writer of Urdu language. He was also a poet, critic and film lyricist.

Biography

Early life and education
Ali Sardar Jafri was born in Balrampur, Uttar Pradesh, where he spent his formative years.

His early influences were Mir Anees and Josh Malihabadi. In 1933, he was admitted to Aligarh Muslim University (AMU) where he soon got exposed to Communist ideology and in 1936 he was expelled from the University for 'political reasons'. However, he graduated in 1938 from Zakir Husain College (Delhi College), Delhi University, but his subsequent postgraduate studies at Lucknow University ended prematurely following his arrest during 1940–41 for writing anti-War poems, and for taking part in political activities organised by the Indian National Congress as Secretary of the university's Students' Union.

Literary career
Jafri embarked on his literary career in 1938 with the publication of his first collection of short stories called Manzil (Destination). His first collection of poems  Parvaz (Flight) was published in 1944. In 1936, he presided over the first conference of the Progressive Writers' Movement in Lucknow. He also presided over their subsequent assemblies for the rest of his life.<ref> Frontline, Volume 17 – Issue 17, 19 August – 1 September 2000.</ref> In 1939, he became co-editor of Naya Adab, a literary journal devoted to the Progressive Writers' Movement which continued to be published until 1949.

He was involved in several social, political and literary movements. On 20 January 1949, he was arrested at Bhiwandi, for organising a (then banned) Progressive Urdu writers' conference, despite warnings from Morarji Desai, the Chief Minister of Bombay State; three months later, he was rearrested.

His important works as a lyricist include Dharti Ke Lal (1946) and Pardesi (1957) . Between 1948 and 1978 he published eight poetry collections, which include, Nai Duniya Ko Salaam (Salute to the New World), (1948), Khoon Ki Lakeer, Amn Ka Sitara, Asia Jaag Utha (Asia Awakes) (1951), Patthar Ki Deewar (Stone Wall) (1953), Ek Khwab Aur (One More Dream), Pairahan-i-Sharar (The Robe of Sparks) (1965) and Lahu Pukarta Hai (The Blood Calls) (1965). These were followed by Awadh ki khak-i-haseen (Beautiful Land of Awadh), Subhe Farda (Tomorrow Morning), Mera Safar (My journey) and his last anthology entitled  Sarhad, which the then Prime Minister of India Atal Bihari Vajpayee carried with him on his bus journey to Lahore in 1999. The prime minister had invited Jafri to accompany him on this trip but ill health prevented him from doing so. Sarhad is also an audio album dedicated to Indo-Pakistan amity produced by Squadron Leader Anil Sehgal and composed and sung by "Bulbul-e-Kashmir" Seema Anil Sehgal. Atal Bihari Vajpayee made history when he presented Sarhad, as a national gift, to the then prime minister of Pakistan Nawaz Sharif, during the historic Lahore Summit, 20–21 February 1999. It was also a milestone in Jafri's life.

In the course of his literary career spanning five decades, Jafri also edited anthologies of Kabir, Mir, Ghalib and Meera Bai with his own introductions. He also wrote two plays for the Indian People's Theatre Association, produced a documentary film Kabir, Iqbal and Freedom and two television serials: the runaway success, the 18-part Kahkashan, based on the lives and works of six Urdu poets of the 20th century he had known personally viz. Firaq Gorakhpuri, Josh Malihabadi, Majaz, Hasrat Mohani, Makhdoom Mohiuddin and Jigar Moradabadi; and Mehfil-e-yaaran  in which he interviewed people from different walks of life. Both serials had tremendous mass appeal. In addition, he published his autobiography. He was also the editor and publisher of Guftagu, one of the leading Urdu literary magazines of the Indian sub-continent.

He died on 1 August 2000 in Mumbai. To mark his first death anniversary, the book Ali Sardar Jafri: The Youthful Boatman of Joy'', edited by Squadron Leader Anil Sehgal,  a close associate, was published in 2001.

Excerpts from poems

Awards and honours
In 1998, Jafri became the third Urdu poet to receive the Jnanpith Award (for 1997), after Firaq Gorakhpuri (1969) and Qurratulain Hyder (1989). The Bharatiya Jnanpith said, "Jafri represents those who are fighting against injustice and oppression in society". He was also the recipient of several other significant awards and honours including Padma Shri (1967), Jawaharlal Nehru Fellowship (1971), the Gold medal from the Pakistan Government for Iqbal studies (1978), the Uttar Pradesh Urdu Academy Award for poetry, the Makhdoom Award, the Faiz Ahmad Faiz Award, the Iqbal Samman Award from the Madhya Pradesh government and the Sant Dyaneshwar Award from the Maharashtra government.

Aligarh Muslim University (AMU) conferred a doctorate (D.Litt.) on him in 1986, fifty years after he was expelled from the university. He was the fourth person to receive this honor, his predecessors being the notable Dr. Alama Iqbal, Mrs. Sarojni Naydu, and Hazarat Jigar Moradabadi.  His works have been translated into many Indian and foreign languages.

Personal life
Ali Sardar Jafri married Sultana in January 1948. They had two sons.

References

External links 
 
 
 A collection of verses by Ali Sardar Jafri 
"Ali Sardar Jafri Ba Hasiyat Nasr-Nigar" by Dr. Kapil Sharma

1913 births
2000 deaths
Recipients of the Padma Shri in literature & education
Recipients of the Jnanpith Award
Recipients of the Gangadhar National Award
People from Balrampur
Delhi University alumni
Aligarh Muslim University alumni
University of Lucknow alumni
Urdu-language poets from India
Urdu-language short story writers
Indian literary critics
Indian lyricists
20th-century Indian Muslims
20th-century Indian poets
Jawaharlal Nehru Fellows
Indian male poets
Poets from Uttar Pradesh